The 1240s BC is a decade which lasted from 1249 BC to 1240 BC.

Events and trends
 c. 1240 BC—The Philistines expand their influence into Cyprus and Canaan.
 c. 1240 BC—The wimble and lathe are invented.

Significant people
 Merneptah, pharaoh of Egypt, born (approximate date).

In legend
 1249 BC—Gideon conquers the Midianites.
 c. 1240 BC—The Argonauts capture Troy.

References

 

es:Años 1240 a. C.

Joshua 6-22